The 2018 Jinan International Open was a professional tennis tournament played on outdoor hard courts. It was the second (ATP) and first (ITF) editions of the tournament and was part of the 2018 ATP Challenger Tour and the 2018 ITF Women's Circuit. It took place in Jinan, China, on 6–12 August 2018.

Men's singles main draw entrants

Seeds

 1 Rankings are as of 30 July 2018.

Other entrants
The following players received wildcards into the singles main draw:
  Gao Xin
  He Yecong
  Xia Zihao
  Zhang Zhizhen

The following players received entry from the qualifying draw:
  Bai Yan
  Alexei Popyrin
  Manish Sureshkumar
  Tak Khunn Wang

The following player received entry as a lucky loser:
  Wu Tung-lin

Women's singles main draw entrants

Seeds 

 1 Rankings as of 30 July 2018.

Other entrants 
The following players received a wildcard into the singles main draw:
  Yu Wenjun
  Zheng Qinwen

The following players received entry from the qualifying draw:
  Eudice Chong
  Mai Hontama
  Ma Yexin
  Wang Meiling

Champions

Men's singles

 Alexei Popyrin def.  James Ward 3–6, 6–1, 7–5.

Women's singles

 Zhu Lin def.  Wang Yafan, 6–4, 6–1

Men's doubles

 Hsieh Cheng-peng /  Yang Tsung-hua def.  Alexander Bublik /  Alexander Pavlioutchenkov 7–6(7–5), 4–6, [10–5].

Women's doubles

 Wang Xinyu /  You Xiaodi def.  Hsieh Shu-ying /  Lu Jingjing, 6–3, 6–7(5–7), [10–2]

External links 
 2018 Jinan International Open at ITFtennis.com

2018 ITF Women's Circuit
2018 ATP Challenger Tour
2018 in Chinese tennis
Jinan International Open